Jerry or Jerome Robertson may refer to:

Jerry Robertson (baseball) (1943–1996), Major League Baseball pitcher
Jerry Robertson (racing driver) (born 1962), NASCAR driver
Jerome B. Robertson (1815–1890), doctor, Indian fighter, Texas politician and general

See also
 Robertson (surname)